The 2019–20 Biathlon World Cup – Individual Women started on 5 December 2019 in Östersund and will finished on 18 February 2020 in Antholz-Anterselva.

Competition format
The individual race is the oldest biathlon event; the distance is skied over five laps. The biathlete shoots four times at any shooting lane, in the order of prone, standing, prone, standing, totalling 20 targets. Competitors' starts are staggered, normally by 30 seconds. The distance skied is usually 15 kilometres (9.3 mi) with a fixed penalty time of one minute per missed target that is added to the skiing time of the biathlete. In the "Short Individual" the distance is 12.5 kilometres (7.8 mi) with a penalty time of 45 seconds per missed target.

2018–19 Top 3 standings

Medal winners

Standings

References

Individual Women